Kazala Stara  (1940-1945 German: Altkasala) a village in the administrative district of Gmina Mycielin, within Kalisz County, Greater Poland Voivodeship, in west-central Poland.

The village has a population of 70.

References

Kazala Stara